Offcote and Underwood is a civil parish in the Derbyshire Dales district of Derbyshire, England. The parish contains twelve listed buildings that are recorded in the National Heritage List for England. All the listed buildings are designated at Grade II, the lowest of the three grades, which is applied to "buildings of national importance and special interest". The parish is almost completely rural and contains no significant settlements. Apart from a milepost, all the listed buildings are houses, farmhouses and associated structures.


Buildings

References

Citations

Sources

 

Lists of listed buildings in Derbyshire